Ariana Gilabert Vilaplana (born 12 April 2000) is a Spanish professional racing cyclist, who currently rides for UCI Women's Continental Team .

References

External links
 

2000 births
Living people
Spanish female cyclists
Place of birth missing (living people)
21st-century Spanish women